Ardeadoris electra is a species of sea slug, a dorid nudibranch, a shell-less marine gastropod mollusc in the family Chromodorididae. It was transferred to the genus Ardeadoris on the basis of DNA evidence.

Distribution 
This species is found in the tropical Western Pacific Ocean around eastern Australia and New Caledonia.

References
 

Chromodorididae
Gastropods described in 1990